Barrett House may refer to:

in the United States (by state then city)
William G. Barrett House, Sausalito, California, listed on the National Register of Historic Places (NRHP) in Marin County 
Barrett-Blakeman House, Greensburg, Kentucky, listed on the NRHP in Green County
Barret House (Henderson, Kentucky), NRHP-listed
Dr. Lewis Barrett House, Munfordville, Kentucky, listed on the NRHP in Hart County
P. J. Barrett Block, Adams, Massachusetts, listed on the NRHP in Berkshire County
Col. James Barrett Farm, Concord, Massachusetts, listed on the NRHP in Middlesex County
Randolph Columbus Barrett House, Doniphan, Missouri, National Register of Historic Places in Ripley County
Martin Barrett House, Dillon, Montana, listed on the NRHP in Beaverhead County
Barrett House (New Ipswich, New Hampshire)
Oliver Barrett House, Millerton, New York, listed on the NRHP in Dutchess County
Barrett House (Poughkeepsie, New York), listed on the NRHP in Dutchess County
Barrett-Faulkner House, Peachland, North Carolina, listed on the NRHP in Anson County
George Barrett Concrete House, Spring Valley, Ohio, listed on the NRHP in Greene County 
Rufus Barrett Stone House, Bradford, Pennsylvania, listed on the NRHP in McKean County
William & Elizabeth Barrett Farmstead, Mendon, Utah, listed on the NRHP in Cache County
Richard Barrett House, Park City, Utah, listed on the 
National Register of Historic Places in Summit County
Barrett-Chumney House, Amelia Courthouse, Virginia, listed on the NRHP in Amelia County
Everett P. Barrett House, Waukesha, Wisconsin, listed on the NRHP in Waukesha County